Rosenborg Ballklub is an association football club based in Trondheim, Norway. It is Norway's most successful club, having won the Norwegian Premier League twenty-two times and the Norwegian Football Cup nine times. Although founded in 1917, it was not permitted to play Football Association of Norway-sanctioned matches until 1928 because of restrictions on the number of teams allowed to join the regional football association. It then joined the regional Class B and went through several promotions and relegations until joining the inaugural eleven-conference top-tier League of Norway in 1937–38. After World War II, the club moved between the Third Division and the Regional League (second tier), seeing promotion or relegation more seasons than not. The club reached the Main League in 1960–61, but was subsequently relegated after the 1961–62 season.

After four years at tier two, Rosenborg joined the First Division in 1967 and won the league that season. Since, Rosenborg has only played the 1978 season at the second tier. The First Division was renamed the Norwegian Premier League in 1991. The club entered the cup for the first time in 1932, claiming its first title in 1960. Rosenborg has experienced two golden eras; the first in the 1960s and early 1970s resulted in three league and three cup honors, in addition to an equal number of runner-up positions in both tournaments. The second golden era started with winning the league in 1985 and has resulted in nineteen league and six cup titles. Fourteen league titles were claimed under manager Nils Arne Eggen and sixteen have been won by midfielder Roar Strand. Rosenborg won thirteen consecutive league trophies between 1992 and 2004.

Rosenborg has played 206 matches in 32 seasons in Union of European Football Associations (UEFA) tournaments, starting with the 1965–66 European Cup Winners' Cup. Their only European trophy came when they co-won the 2008 UEFA Intertoto Cup. Rosenborg has entered the UEFA Champions League and its predecessor, the European Cup, twenty times, and reached the group stage eleven times, including eight consecutive seasons from 1995–96 though 2002–03. The best performance is reaching the quarter-finals in 1996–97, where they lost to Juventus. Rosenborg has played 16 seasons in the UEFA Europa League and its predecessors, the UEFA Cup and the Inter-Cities Fairs Cup. The club has also won the 2010 Superfinalen, Norway's defunct two-season super cup, and participated twice in the Royal League.

Key

League table key
 P = Played
 W = Games won
 D = Games drawn
 L = Games lost
 F = Goals for
 A = Goals against
 Pts = Points
 Pos = Final position
 Att = Average attendance

Competition key
 LoN = League of Norway
 ML = Main League
 TL = Tippeligaen
 1D = First Division
 2D = Second Division
 3D = Third Division
 RL = Regional League
 RLQ = Regional League Qualifier
 A = Class A
 B = Class B
 CL = Champions League
 EL = Europa League

Position key
 W  = Winner
 CO = Co-winner
 RU = Runners-up
 SF = Semi-finals
 QF = Quarter-finals
 G  = Group stage
 G2 = Second group stage
 PO = Play-off round

 Q1 = First qualifying round
 Q2 = Second qualifying round
 Q3 = Third qualifying round
 R1 = Round 1
 R2 = Round 2
 R3 = Round 3
 R4 = Round 4

Seasons
The following is a list of Rosenborg BK's seasons since they were permitted to play in Football Association of Norway-sanction matches from the 1928 season. It contains the results of the league, including the division, position and average league attendance; the result in the Norwegian Football Cup; participation in other official tournaments, including promotion and relegation play-offs, Champions League and Europa League; and the top goalscorer for the club in the domestic league and the number of goals he scored.

See also
 The Invincibles (football)

Notes
Notes

References
Footnotes

Bibliography

Seasons
 
Rosenborg